Arthur Riley (26 December 1903 – July 1984) was a South African international footballer who also played football for Liverpool.

Life and playing career
On 26 November 1939, Riley played in goal as part of an All-British XI versus a Football League XI, in the Red Cross Fund International. The All-British XI lost the match 3–2.

Riley died in July 1984 in Cape Town, South Africa. However some sources claim he died in St Helens, Merseyside.

Career details

 Liverpool F.C (1925–1940) – 338 appearances

References

External links
 Player profile at LFChistory .net

1903 births
1984 deaths
Liverpool F.C. players
South African soccer players
Association football goalkeepers
People from Boksburg
Soccer players from Gauteng
South African expatriate sportspeople in England
South African expatriate soccer players
Expatriate footballers in England
English Football League players
White South African people